Reunion is a  live album recorded at Centro Rai di Produzione Radiofonica in Rome in January 2003 by the Art Ensemble of Chicago and released on the Italian Around Jazz label. It marked the return of Joseph Jarman to the group and features performances by Jarman, Roscoe Mitchell, Malachi Favors Maghostut and Don Moye with Baba Sissoko. It is the first live Art Ensemble album to be released following the death of founding member Lester Bowie.

Track listing
 "Illinstrum" (Don Moye/Malachi Favors) - 10:09
 "T Two Twin" (Roscoe Mitchell) - 5:57
 "Wolonà" (Baba Sissoko) - 4:41
 "Ce Soir  A Bankoni" (Sissoko/Moye) - 4:33
 "Hail We Now Sing Joy" (Joseph Jarman) - 5:59
 "Medley: All In Together/Zero/Alternate Line/Odwalla" (Mitchell/Lester Bowie/Mitchell/Mitchell) - 23:11
 "Urban Bushmen (Art Ensemble of Chicago) - 6:28
Recorded at Centro Rai di Produzione Radiofonica in Rome on January 22, 2003

Personnel
Joseph Jarman: sopranino saxophone, alto saxophone tenor saxophone, flute, percussion, voice
Roscoe Mitchell: soprano saxophone, alto saxophone, flute, percussion 
Malachi Favors Maghostut: bass, percussion
Don Moye: drums, congas, percussion
Baba Sissoko: percussion

References

Art Ensemble of Chicago live albums
2003 live albums